There were 51 Free Imperial Cities in the Holy Roman Empire as of 1792. They are listed here with their official confessional status confirmed by the Peace of Westphalia (1648).

In many of these coats of arms, an eagle reflects the direct association with the Holy Roman Emperor, whose own standard was that of an imperial eagle.

Other cities which were once Free Imperial cities, but had ceased to be so by 1792, include:

Baden (formally only?)
Basel (became a Swiss Canton, 1501, independence from the Empire recognized 1648)
Bern (became a Swiss Canton, 1351, independence recognized 1648)
Bisanz (Besançon) (annexed by Spain, 1648)
Brakel (annexed by the bishop of Paderborn)
Bremgarten (formally only?)
Boppard (to Electorate of Trier)
Kamerich (Cambrai) (to the Spanish Netherlands, 1543)
Diessenhofen
Deventer
Donauwörth (to Bavaria, 1617)
Duisburg (to Cleves, 1290)
Düren (to Jülich)
Frauenfeld
Freiburg im Üechtland (Fribourg) (became a Swiss Canton)
Füssen (to the Prince-Bishopric of Augsburg, 1313)
Gelnhausen (to Hesse-Kassel (or Hesse-Cassel), 1745)
Hagenau (annexed by France, 1670s)
Herford (to Brandenburg)
Colmar (annexed by France, 1673, confirmed 1697)
Kampen
Kaisersberg (annexed by France, 1648)
Kessenich
Konstanz (annexed by Austria, 1548)
Landau (annexed by France, 1648)
Lemgo (to Lippe)
Lucerne (became a Swiss Canton, independence recognized 1648)
Mainz (returned to the control of its archbishop, 1462)
Metz (annexed by France, 1552)
Mülhausen (Mulhouse) (an associate of the Swiss Confederation after 1648, annexed by France, 1798)
Münster im Elsass (annexed by France, 1648)
Murten (to Savoy, 1255)
Nijmegen (to Guelders, 1247)
Oberehnheim (annexed by France, 1648)
Rapperswil
Rheinfelden (to the Habsburgs, 1330)
Riga (to the Polish–Lithuanian Commonwealth, 1581)
Rosheim (annexed by France, 1648)
Saarburg (Sarrebourg) (annexed by France)
Schaffhausen (became a Swiss Canton, 1501, independence recognized 1648)
Schmalkalden (to Hesse, 1581)
Schlettstadt (Sélestat) (annexed by France, 1670s)
Solothurn (became a Swiss Canton, 1481, independence recognized 1648)
Strassburg (annexed by France, 1681, confirmed 1697)
Toul (annexed by France, 1552)
Türkheim (Turckheim) (annexed by France, 1648)
Verden (to Duchy of Verden, 1648)
Verdun (annexed by France, 1552)
Warburg (annexed by the prince-bishop of Paderborn)
Winterthur
Weißenburg (Wissembourg) (annexed by France, 1648)
Zug (became a Swiss Canton, independence recognized 1648) 
Zürich (became a Swiss Canton, 1351, independence recognized 1648)

Confederations
Hanseatic League
Décapole

References

 
Cities